A nunatak is an exposed peak projecting through an ice field or glacier.

Nunatak may also refer to:

Nunatak (band), band comprising members of the British Antarctic Survey, who represented Antarctica at Live Earth in 2007
Nunatak Glacier, NE Greenland
Nunatak Island, an island in Nunavut, Canada